Shonar Bangla Express (Train no. 787/788) is an intercity train of Bangladesh Railway which runs between Dhaka (capital of Bangladesh) and Chittagong. Along with Suborno Express, Shonar Bangla Express has been considered one of the prestigious trains in Bangladesh. The train connects capital Dhaka with port city Chittagong of Bangladesh.

History 

Shonar Bangla was introduced as a non stop inter-city train which offers quality food and fast service. Since its inauguration, the train had started from Dhaka Railway Station . Shonar Bangla gets the top priority on Bangladesh Railway network. It only gives stoppage at Dhaka Airport Station. The fare of the train is higher than Subarna Express. The Fare includes food price supplied by Bangladesh Parjatan Corporation.

Schedule 
The train departs Dhaka railway station at 07:00 AM (Bangladesh Standard Time) and arrives Chittagong at 12:20 PM. In return trip, it departs Chittagong at 05:00 PM and arrives Dhaka  at 10:10 PM. Tuesday is the weekly holiday of this train from Chittagong and Wednesday is from Dhaka

Carriages 
The train currently runs with 14 Indonesia made red-green PT INKA air-brake coaches. However, sometimes the train pulls up to 18 coaches if there is compelling demand. These coaches were imported on 2016.

Locomotive 
Shonar Bangla Express is hauled by a Class 2900 of Bangladesh Railway. The train needs an air-braked locomotive which is mandatory.

Stoppages 
 Dhaka Bimanbandor

References

External links

Named passenger trains of Bangladesh
Railway services introduced in 2016
Transport in Chittagong
Transport in Dhaka